Thomas C. Thornton (October 12, 1794 – March 22, 1860) was an American Methodist writer, minister and educator. Thornton was president of Centenary College of Louisiana from 1841 to 1844.  He was also author of a proslavery tract, An Inquiry into the History of Slavery, published in 1841.

Publications

books

Notes and references

External links
books.google version of Thornton's Inquiry into the History of Slavery
Internet Archive version of Thornton's Inquiry into the History of Slavery

19th-century American people
Centenary College of Louisiana faculty
Arminian ministers
Arminian writers
American Methodist clergy
American male writers
American proslavery activists
1860 deaths
1794 births
19th-century American clergy